The North Dakota Association of Counties (NDACo), formed in 1975, is a member association formed by the 53 counties in the U.S. state of North Dakota. The Association provides government relations, publication, legislative, and other member relation work on behalf of the counties of North Dakota.

See also
List of counties in North Dakota

References

Organizations based in North Dakota

United States Associations of Counties
1975 establishments in North Dakota
Organizations established in 1975